Myllita stowei is a species of bivalve, a marine gastropod mollusc in the family Lasaeidae. It was first described as Pythina stowei by Frederick Wollaston Hutton in 1873, and recategorised as Myllita stowei in 1913 by Henry Suter. It is endemic to the waters of New Zealand.

Description

Myllita stowei has an elongated appearance relative to other Lasaeidae species, and has divaricating ridges on the exterior shell. The species reaches up to 15 millimetres in length and 9 millimetres in height. Shells of the species have between eight and nine divaricating ribs along the shell. The foot is pear-shaped and white in colour.

Distribution
The species is Endemic to New Zealand. Myllita stowei  is uncommonly found around central and northern New Zealand, and less commonly around the South Island.

The bivalve is typically attached to the undersides of intertidal boulders. It is more commonly discovered as a shell, with living specimens being extremely rare finds.

References

Gastropods described in 1873
Gastropods of New Zealand
Endemic fauna of New Zealand
Endemic molluscs of New Zealand
Lasaeidae
Molluscs of the Pacific Ocean
Taxa named by Frederick Hutton (scientist)